Zavodski District is an administrative subdivision of the city of Minsk, Belarus. It was formed in 1938 under the name Stalin district (Russian: Сталинский) and The "Factory district" was named in 1961 after the plants "Minsk Tractor Works" (MTZ) and "Minsk Automobile Plant" (MAZ) were constructed. Within current borders the district is approved on 10 November 1997 when the township "Sosny" was officially added to it.

Geography
The district is situated in the south-eastern area of the city and borders with Partyzanski and Leninsky districts. Maly Trostenets extermination camp was located within Zavodski district.

Transport
Zavodski is served by the tram line and by the Awtazavodskaya subway line. It is also crossed by the MKAD beltway .

See also
Minsk Zoo
Maly Trostenets

References

External links
 Zavodski District official website

Districts of Minsk